Cut the World is a live album by Antony and the Johnsons, recorded in Copenhagen and released in August 2012.

In 2012 it was awarded a double silver certification from the Independent Music Companies Association, which indicated sales of at least 40,000 copies throughout Europe.

Reception

Cut the World received wide acclaim from contemporary music critics. At Metacritic, which assigns a normalized rating out of 100 to reviews from mainstream critics, the album received an average score of 82, based on 31 reviews, which indicates "universal acclaim".

Track listing

 The title track "Cut the World" is a new song from Anohni that was made for the play The Life and Death of Marina Abramović directed by Robert Wilson and starring Anohni, Marina Abramović and Willem Dafoe.
 "Future Feminism" is a spoken word track where Anohni "discusses [her] ideas in a speech [she] made during one of the concerts. Addressing the effects of patriarchy on the global ecology, Anohni explores the possibility of shifting towards feminine systems of governance in a gesture to restore our world."

Personnel
Credits adapted from Cut the World album liner notes.

Antony and the Johnsons
 Anohni – vocals, arranger
 Thomas Bartlett – piano
 Rob Moose – arranger, conductor
 Maxim Moston – arranger

Additional

 Greg Calbi – mastering
 Danish National Chamber Orchestra – orchestra
 Erik Heide – first violin
 Tatjana Kandel – orchestra artistic manager
 Inez van Lamsweerde and Vinoodh Matadin – photography
 Jens Langkilde – recording technician

 Shaun MacDonald – administration
 Nico Muhly – arranger
 Daniel Murphy – layout
 Ossian Ryner – engineer, mixing
 Karl Bjerre Skibsted – producer
 Robert Wilson – director (1)

Charts

References

2012 live albums
Antony and the Johnsons albums
Rough Trade Records live albums
Secretly Canadian live albums